Captain Gibson may refer to:

James Gibson (seaman) (1700–1752), British sea captain, soldier, and merchant
Julie Ann Gibson (born 1956), British Royal Air Force captain
Robert L. Gibson (born 1946), American naval captain and NASA astronaut
Walter M. Gibson (1822–1888), American adventurer and ship's captain